Adrien Nicholas Brody (born April 14, 1973) is an American actor. He received widespread recognition and acclaim after starring as Władysław Szpilman in Roman Polanski's The Pianist (2002), for which he won the Academy Award for Best Actor at age 29, becoming the youngest actor to win in that category. Brody is the second male American actor after Christopher Lambert to receive the César Award for Best Actor.

Other successful films that Brody has starred in are The Thin Red Line (1998), The Village (2004), King Kong (2005), Predators (2010) and Midnight in Paris (2011). He is a frequent collaborator of Wes Anderson's, having starred in four of Anderson's films, The Darjeeling Limited (2007), Fantastic Mr. Fox (2009), The Grand Budapest Hotel (2014), and The French Dispatch (2021). In 2017, he portrayed Luca Changretta in the fourth season of the BBC series Peaky Blinders. In 2022, he portrayed Arthur Miller in the Marilyn Monroe biopic Blonde and also starred as Pat Riley in the first season of the HBO sports drama series Winning Time: The Rise of the Lakers Dynasty.

Early life
Brody was born in Woodhaven, Queens, New York City, the son of Sylvia Plachy, a photographer, and Elliot Brody, a retired history professor and painter. Brody's father is of Polish Jewish descent; Brody's mother, who was raised Catholic, was born in Budapest, Hungary, and is the daughter of a Catholic Hungarian aristocrat father and a Czech Jewish mother, although Brody says he was raised "without a strong connection" to either Judaism or Christianity.

As a child, Brody performed magic shows at children's birthday parties as "The Amazing Adrien". He attended I.S. 145 Joseph Pulitzer Middle School and New York's Fiorello H. LaGuardia High School of Music & Art and Performing Arts. His parents enrolled him in acting classes to distance him from the dangerous children with whom he associated. He attended summer camp at Long Lake Camp for the Arts in the Adirondacks in upstate New York. Brody attended Stony Brook University before transferring to Queens College for a semester.

Career
Taking acting classes as a child, by age thirteen, he appeared in an Off-Broadway play and a PBS television film. After appearing in Bullet in 1996 with Tupac Shakur and Mickey Rourke, Brody hovered on the brink of stardom, receiving an Independent Spirit Award nomination for his role in the 1998 film Restaurant, and later praise for his roles in Spike Lee's Summer of Sam and Terrence Malick's The Thin Red Line. He received widespread recognition when he was cast as the lead in Roman Polanski's The Pianist (2002). The role won him an Academy Award for Best Actor, making him, at age twenty nine, the youngest actor ever to win the award, and, to date, the only winner under the age of thirty. He also won a César Award for his performance.

Brody appeared on Saturday Night Live on May 10, 2003, his first TV work. During this appearance, he controversially gave an introduction for Jamaican reggae musical guest Sean Paul, while wearing faux dreadlocks and using a Jamaican accent. It was reported at the time that he had improvised the bit, causing him to be banned from Saturday Night Live, however it was later revealed it was part of the dress rehearsal too. Other TV appearances include NBC's The Today Show, and on MTV's Punk'd after being tricked by Ashton Kutcher.

After The Pianist, Brody appeared in four very different films. In Dummy (released in 2003, but originally shot in 2000, just prior to his work in The Pianist), he portrayed Steven Schoichet, a socially awkward aspiring ventriloquist in pursuit of a love interest (his employment counsellor). He learned ventriloquism and puppetry for the role (under the tutelage of actor/ventriloquist Alan Semok) convincingly enough to perform all of the voice stunts and puppet manipulation live on set in real time, with no subsequent post dubbing. He played Noah Percy, a mentally disabled young man, in the film The Village, by M. Night Shyamalan, shell-shocked war veteran Jack Starks in The Jacket, writer Jack Driscoll in the 2005 King Kong remake, and father-to-be Peter Whitman in The Darjeeling Limited by Wes Anderson. King Kong was both a critical and box office success—it grossed $550 million worldwide, and is Brody's most successful film to date, financially. He reprised his role voicing Driscoll in the video game adaptation of the film. Additionally, Brody played a detective in Hollywoodland. He has also appeared in Diet Coke and Schweppes commercials, as well as Tori Amos' music video for "A Sorta Fairytale".

On January 5, 2006, Brody confirmed speculation that he was interested in playing the role of The Joker in 2008's The Dark Knight.  and also met with director Christopher Nolan. However, Nolan and Warner Bros. decided instead to cast Heath Ledger in the role. He was also in talks with Paramount to play Spock in J. J. Abrams' Star Trek, but it ultimately went to Zachary Quinto. In 2009, he starred in Splice, a science-fiction film written and directed by Vincenzo Natali. Originally a Sundance film, Splice was adopted by Dark Castle Entertainment and distributed by Warner Bros. In 2010, he played the star role of Royce in Predators (a sequel to the original Predator), directed by Nimród Antal and produced by Robert Rodriguez.

In 2011, Brody starred in a Stella Artois beer ad called "Crying Jean" that premiered right after half-time of Super Bowl XLV as part of Stella's "She Is a Thing of Beauty" campaign. He appeared in Woody Allen's 2011 Academy Award-winning comedy, Midnight in Paris as Salvador Dalí. On January 16, 2012, Brody made his debut as a runway model for Prada Men Fall/Winter 2012 show.

In 2014, Brody collaborated again with Wes Anderson in the Academy Award-winning The Grand Budapest Hotel, where he played Dmitri. He received an Emmy Award nomination for Outstanding Lead Actor in a Miniseries or in a Movie for portraying the title character in Houdini a History miniseries. The same year Brody was cast as the title role of Lee Tamahori's action epic Emperor, about a young woman seeking revenge for the execution of her father by Holy Roman Emperor Charles V, opposite Sophie Cookson. The movie was finished and screened at Cannes in 2017 but its release has been  by legal challenges.

In 2015, he starred as Tiberius in the Chinese film Dragon Blade, which grossed $54.8 million in its opening week in China. He also received the Cinema Vanguard award at the San Diego Film Festival the same year.

In 2017, it was announced that he would join the cast of the fourth season of the BBC crime drama Peaky Blinders. On August 4, 2017, he received the Leopard Club Award at the Locarno Festival. The Leopard Club Award pays homage to a major film personality whose work has made a lasting impact on the collective imagination.

In 2019, Brody left Paradigm to sign with CAA Creative Artists Agency.

In 2021, he received the Vanguard Award at SCAD's Savannah Film Festival.

Personal life
In 1992, Brody was seriously hurt in a motorcycle accident in which he flew over a car and crashed head-first into a crosswalk. He spent months recuperating. He has broken his nose three times doing stunts, including during the filming of Summer of Sam.

Brody began dating Spanish actress and model Elsa Pataky in 2006. For Pataky's 31st birthday in July 2007, Brody purchased for her a 19th-century farm in Central New York state that was remodeled to look like a castle. Brody and Pataky were featured at their New York home in a 35-page spread for HELLO! magazine in October 2008. The pair broke up in 2009.

In 2009, Brody signed a petition which called for the release of Roman Polanski, during his arrest in Switzerland for his 1977 charge for drugging and raping a 13-year-old girl.

In 2010, Brody sued makers of the film Giallo, alleging they failed to pay his full salary.

In February 2020, it was reported that he was in a relationship with English fashion designer and actress Georgina Chapman, former wife of Harvey Weinstein.

Filmography

Film

Television

Video games

Music videos

References

External links

 
 

1973 births
Living people
20th-century American male actors
21st-century American male actors
American male film actors
American male television actors
American male video game actors
American male voice actors
American male child actors
American people of Hungarian descent
American people of Czech-Jewish descent
American people of Polish-Jewish descent
Audiobook narrators
Best Actor Academy Award winners
Best Actor César Award winners
Male actors from New York City
People from Woodhaven, Queens
American expatriates in England
American Academy of Dramatic Arts alumni
Queens College, City University of New York alumni
Stony Brook University alumni
Fiorello H. LaGuardia High School alumni
Method actors